Roger Keith Ver (born 27 January 1979) is an early investor in Bitcoin, Bitcoin-related startups and an early promoter of Bitcoin. Ver has sometimes been referred to as "Bitcoin Jesus". He now primarily promotes Bitcoin Cash as Ver sees it as fulfilling the intended and original purpose of the "Bitcoin White Paper", first published in 2009 by Satoshi Nakamoto, in which Nakamoto referred to Bitcoin as a peer-to-peer electronic cash system. 

Born and raised in Silicon Valley, he sold fireworks on eBay and later pleaded guilty to a related felony charge. He served 10 months in prison then moved to Japan in 2005. He renounced his United States citizenship in 2014 after obtaining a Saint Kitts and Nevis passport. He previously served as CEO of Bitcoin.com.

Personal life
Ver was born in San Jose, California. He attended Valley Christian High School. He then attended De Anza College for one year, before dropping out to pursue his business interests. He identifies as a libertarian, anarcho-capitalist, voluntaryist, a peace advocate, and an advocate for individualism. Ver attempted a run for California state assembly in the Libertarian party. During a debate in the run up to this election, he claimed that the Drug Enforcement Agency was criminal in its practice. He moved to Japan in 2005, where he still maintains his residence as of 2021.

Ver renounced his United States citizenship in 2014 after he became a citizen of Saint Kitts and Nevis. In 2015, he was denied a visa to reenter the United States by the U.S. Embassy in Barbados, which claimed that he had not sufficiently proven ties outside of the United States that would motivate him to leave at the end of his visit, causing fears he might become an illegal immigrant. Ver's name was published in the 2018 Q1 Quarterly Publication of Individuals Who Have Chosen to Expatriate. In 2019, Ver was denied a visa to travel to Australia.

According to an interview he gave in 2016, Ver describes Brazilian jiu-jitsu as one of his major passions in life. Ver can be seen in videos competing in BJJ world championships and has achieved the rank of brown belt.

In 2018 he was ranked number 36 in Fortune's "The Ledger 40 under 40" for transforming business at the leading edge of finance and technology.

Career

MemoryDealers.com
Ver was the CEO of MemoryDealers.com from 1999 until 2012. In 2000, he attempted to enter politics by running for California State Assembly as a candidate for the Libertarian Party.

Explosives charges
In 2002, Ver pleaded guilty to selling explosive materials without a license, as well as illegally storing and mailing them. Ver sold at least 14 pounds of a brand called "Pest Control Report 2000" fireworks as large firecrackers on eBay, stored them in a residential apartment building, and mailed them to customers via the U.S. Postal Service. He was sentenced to 10 months in federal prison. The manufacturer was later forced to stop making and selling the product, which contained gunpowder far above the legal limit for consumer firecrackers.

In 2018, Ver made a video that he posted to YouTube speaking on his experiences in federal prison. Ver labeled the video as, "My Story of Being Tortured in Prison". Ver claims in the video that he was arrested for "... selling firecrackers on eBay back when eBay had a 'guns and ammo' section and it wasn't a big deal to do that at all."

Cryptocurrency
Ver began investing in bitcoin in early 2011 when "...the price was still under one U.S. Dollar each".  The first investment he made was for Charlie Shrem’s Bitinstant.  Ver's investment allowed the company to hire a designer and another programmer. He invested over a million dollars into new Bitcoin-related startups, including Ripple, Blockchain.com, BitPay, and Kraken. In 2011, Ver's company Memorydealers was the first to accept Bitcoin as payment. He has been a prominent supporter of Bitcoin adoption and saw Bitcoin as a means to promote economic freedom.

In 2012, Ver was organizing Bitcoin meetups in Sunnyvale, California. He is one of five founders of the Bitcoin Foundation. Ver wants Bitcoin to rival major fiat currencies.

He is one of the main proponents of a larger block size for the Bitcoin blockchain. He supported the development of Bitcoin XT as a hard fork method towards an increase. Ver and his high school friend Jesse Powell attempted to re-establish the Mt Gox exchange during the June 2011 Bitcoin price crash.

Ver served as CEO of Bitcoin.com until 1 August 2019, at which point he transitioned to Executive Chairman. Fortune Magazine in early 2020 mistakenly referred to Roger Ver as the co-creator of Bitcoin Cash. As of June 2022, he is a shareholder in CoinFLEX, a centralized yield crypto exchange and is rumoured to be in a large amount of debt which is causing problems for the site. On 23 June 2022, CoinFlex paused withdrawals after a counterparty, which it later named as Ver, experienced liquidity issues and failed to repay a $47 million stablecoin margin call.

See also
 List of former United States citizens who relinquished their nationality

References

External links
 

1979 births
Living people
American anarcho-capitalists
American emigrants to Japan
American investors
American libertarians
Businesspeople from San Jose, California
De Anza College alumni
Naturalised citizens of Saint Kitts and Nevis
People associated with cryptocurrency
People from San Jose, California
Voluntaryists
Former United States citizens